Patrice Vareilles (born 29 November 1978 in Aurillac) is a French professional football player. Currently, he plays in the Championnat National for Fréjus.

He played on the professional level in Ligue 2 for US Créteil-Lusitanos.

External links
Profile at L'Equipe

1978 births
Living people
French footballers
Ligue 2 players
Championnat National players
AS Moulins players
US Créteil-Lusitanos players
FC Aurillac Arpajon Cantal Auvergne players
Association football forwards
People from Aurillac
Sportspeople from Cantal
Footballers from Auvergne-Rhône-Alpes